The football competition at the 1998 Central American and Caribbean Games started on 9 August, although qualification took place beforehand.

Group A

Standings

 Venezuela, Trinidad and Tobago and Nicaragua qualified to Final round.

Group B

Standings

 Jamaica, Costa Rica and Colombia qualified to Final round.

Group C

Standings

 Mexico and El Salvador qualified to Final round.

Final round

Quarterfinals

Semifinals

Third place

Final

External links
 RSSSF.com - Central American and Caribbean Games 1998 (Maracaibo, Venezuela)

1998 Central American and Caribbean Games
1998
CEn
1998
1998–99 in Venezuelan football